The Australian Touring Car Championship, presently known as the Repco Supercars Championship, is a motor racing competition open to Australia's premier touring car category. A driver's title has been awarded since 1960 and titles for teams and manufacturers are also currently awarded. Australia's most famous motor race, the Bathurst 1000, has contributed to the result of the championship since 1999. The second-tier Dunlop Super2 Series has been contested since 2000 and the third-tier V8 Touring Car National Series, for cars no longer officially registered as V8 Supercars, began in 2008.

List of Australian Touring Car Championship and Supercars Championship winners

By season 

Note: The Confederation of Australian Motor Sport awarded the Australian Touring Car Championship title to the winner of the V8 Supercar Championship Series from 1999 to 2010, and to the winner of the International V8 Supercars Championship since 2011. The category had changed its name to V8 Supercars in 1997, but the championship was still called the ATCC for 1997 and 1998.

By driver

List of V8 Supercar Teams' Championship winners

List of V8 Supercar Manufacturers' Championship winners

List of V8 Supercar Development Series winners

List of V8 Touring Car National Series winners

See also
 List of Australian Touring Car Championship races

References

External links
 Confederation of Australian Motorsport
 CAMS Manual section on Australian Titles
 Official V8 Supercars website

 
Lists of motorsport champions
Supercars Championship
Touring Car and V8 Supercar champions